Stegenagapanthia nivalis is a species of beetle in the family Cerambycidae. It was described by Holzschuh in 2007.

References

Lamiini
Beetles described in 2007